The Royal Danish Army is the land-based branch of the Danish Defence, together with the Danish Home Guard. For the last decade, the Royal Danish Army has undergone a massive transformation of structures, equipment and training methods, abandoning its traditional role of anti-invasion defence, and instead focusing on out of area operations by, among other initiatives, reducing the size of the conscripted and reserve components and increasing the active (standing army) component, changing from 60% support structure and 40% operational capability, to 60% combat operational capability and 40% support structure. When fully implemented, the Danish army will be capable of deploying 1,500 troops permanently on three different continents continuously, or 5,000 troops for a shorter period of time, in international operations without any need for extraordinary measures such as parliamentary approval of a war funding bill.

Brief organizational history

Founded in 1614, in the wake of the Kalmar War, the Royal Danish Army was originally designed to prevent conflicts and war, maintain Denmark's sovereignty and protect her interest. With time, these goals have developed into also encompassing the need to protect freedom and peaceful development in the world with respect for human rights.

The Danish King remained commander in chief throughout the Early Modern period, in the Thirty Years' War, the Dano-Swedish War (1657–58) and the Scanian War (1675–1679), the Great Northern War (1700–1721), the Theatre War of 1789/9 and the Napoleonic Wars.
In 1815, however, as a result of continued evolution and division of command, four general commands were created with the King as the supreme authority: Zealand and adjacent islands, Funen Langeland, Jutland and the duchies of Schleswig and Holstein. At the same time, the need for maintenance of the army in peacetime became pertinent, and the Army Operational Command was established.

The Royal Danish Army has historically been an integral part of the defence of Denmark and thus involved in warfare, skirmishes and battles continuously to protect her interests. Most notably various territorial wars with Sweden, Russia and Prussia, the Napoleonic Wars on the side of France, and the Second World War, controversially and famously against the wishes of the Danish government, which had ordered immediate surrender to Germany. In modern times the Royal Danish Army has also become the backbone of Danish international missions, such as those in Kosovo, Iraq and Afghanistan.

Recent deployments

The Royal Danish Army has been committed to a number of United Nations and NATO peacekeeping  and unconventional warfare operations since becoming involved in the Yugoslav Wars under UN mandate in 1994, most notably in the famous Operation Bøllebank. The Royal Danish Army was also engaged in the Kosovo War and continues to this day to maintain peacekeeping operations in Kosovo as part of the United Nations Interim Administration Mission in Kosovo (UNMIK), together with the Danish Home Guard. In addition, the Royal Danish Army was involved in the War in Iraq from 2003 to 2007 with a significant contingent of soldiers responsible for creating and maintaining peace in the province of Basra, together with the British.

Denmark lost its first soldier in Iraq on 17 August 2003 when Preben Pedersen, a 34-year-old Lance Corporal with the Jutland Dragoon Regiment, became the first coalition soldier not from the United States or Britain to die in the Iraq War. Starting in 2001, the Royal Danish Army was also involved in the War in Afghanistan and the Royal Danish Army and the British Army have been involved in heavy clashes with the Taliban in the Helmand Province, where about 760 Danish soldiers controlled a large battlegroup. The Danish army withdrew its combat forces from Afghanistan in May 2014. After the Afghan National Army took responsibility for the security in Afghanistan in 2015, the Danish army has provided training, advisory and security support as part of Resolute Support Mission.

In an effort to relieve police officers in Copenhagen and at the border control, Danish soldiers replaced police officers in 2017 at different locations, marking the first time in 86 years soldiers were used to keep order in cities.

Structure of the Royal Danish Army 

The structure of the Danish army changed in 2015, leaving Danish Division without brigades or support troops directly under its command. The two brigades had only command over combat battalions, as combat support and logistic support units were grouped under various support centres. 1st Brigade consisted of four combat battalions and was tasked with providing troops for international deployments. 2nd Brigade consisted of five battalions and was tasked with the defence of the Danish territory. Support centres contained the army's combat support, combat logistic and general support units. This structure was changed in

  Army Command, in Karup
 Major HQ's & Combat maneuver units
  Multinational Division North, in Ādaži (Latvia)
  1st Brigade, in Holstebro
  2nd Brigade, in Slagelse
 Regiments
  Danish Artillery Regiment, in Oksbøl
 Engineer Regiment, in Skive
  Signal Regiment, in Fredericia
  Train Regiment, in Aalborg
  Intelligence Regiment, in Varde
  Royal Life Guards, in Høvelte
  Guard Hussar Regiment, in Slagelse
  Jutland Dragoon Regiment, in Holstebro
  Schleswig Foot Regiment, in Haderslev

Equipment

Army Aviation Troops 
The Danish Army Aviation Troops (Hærens Flyvertropper) were established in 1923 following the rapid development of military aircraft technology. The Aviation Troops flew two squadrons of Fokker C.V reconnaissance aircraft from 1923 to 1932, when 17 Gloster Gauntlet fighters were purchased to form two new squadrons. 
In 1937, ten Fokker D.XXI fighters were built on licence in the Royal Army Aircraft Factory at Værløse.
As a result of the establishment of the Royal Danish Air Force in 1950, the Army Aviation Troops were disbanded and activities transferred to the new service. During the Cold War the Army created the Royal Danish Army Air Corps(Hærens Flyvetjeneste) in 1971 with 12 Hughes OH-6 Cayuseas Light observation helicopter. in 1974 additional 4 Hughes OH-6 Cayuse was added . In 1990 the army bought 12 Eurocopter Fennec as anti-tank helicopter. But with the end of the Cold War and the reduction of forces, the 12 Eurocopter Fennec AS 550 and 10 Hughes OH-6 Cayuse(both as utility helicopters) were transferred to the Squadron 724 of the Air Force in 2003 and the Army Air Service disbanded.

Ranks and insignia

Each regiment and corps has distinctive insignia, such as a cap badge, berets, Formation patchs or stable belt.
Officers

Other ranks

Disbanded Regiments of the Royal Danish Army

The Army has throughout its long history had many different regiments that have either changed names, been disbanded or been amalgamated or merged. Since the end of the Cold War has seen a lot of cuts to army expenditure, many regiments have been downsized and merged. Likewise further development of military tactics, have led to a streamlining of the regiments.

See also 

 Dancon/Irak
 International Security Assistance Force
 Equipment of the Royal Danish Army
 Royal Danish Navy
 Royal Danish Air Force

References 

 
Military of Denmark
1614 establishments in Denmark